The women's lightweight competition in sumo at the 2017 World Games took place on 22 July 2017 at the Orbita Hall in Wrocław, Poland.

Competition format
A total of 15 athletes entered the competition. They fought in the cup system with repechages.

Results

Main draw

Repechages

Semifinals

Finals

References 

 
2017 World Games